Desroy Findlay (born 3 October 1989) is an Anguillan footballer who plays as a defender for the Anguilla national football team.

Career

International
Findlay made his senior international debut on 8 July 2011 in a 2-0 defeat to the Dominican Republic during World Cup qualifying.

Career statistics

International

References

External links
Desroy Findlay at EuroSport

Living people
1989 births
Anguillan footballers
Anguilla international footballers
Association football defenders
Anguilla under-20 international footballers
Salsa Ballers FC players